

22001–22100 

|-id=002
| 22002 Richardregan ||  || Richard Regan, American mentor of a finalist in the 2005 Discovery Channel Young Scientist Challenge (DCYSC) (Src) || 
|-id=003
| 22003 Startek ||  || Jennifer Startek, Canadian-born mentor of a finalist in the 2005 Discovery Channel Young Scientist Challenge (DCYSC) (Src) || 
|-id=005
| 22005 Willnelson ||  || William Nelson, American mentor of a finalist in the 2005 Discovery Channel Young Scientist Challenge (DCYSC) (Src) || 
|-id=010
| 22010 Kuzmina ||  || Anastasiya Kuzmina (born 1984) is a Russian-born Slovak biathlete who has represented Slovakia since December 2008. She is the first biathlete to win gold medals in three consecutive Winter Olympics (2010 Vancouver, 2014 Sochi and 2018 Pyeongchang). || 
|-id=032
| 22032 Mikekoop ||  || Michael Walter Koop (born 1961), long-time president of the San Jose (California) Astronomical Association, is an electrical engineer by profession. His expertise in telecommunications  has often been applied to meteors, observed from the ground and from aircraft || 
|-id=038
| 22038 Margarshain ||  || Margaret Shain, American mentor of a finalist in the 2005 Discovery Channel Young Scientist Challenge (DCYSC) (Src) || 
|-id=057
| 22057 Brianking ||  || Brian King, American mentor of a finalist in the 2005 Discovery Channel Young Scientist Challenge (DCYSC) (Src) || 
|-id=063
| 22063 Dansealey ||  || Dan Sealey, American mentor of a finalist in the 2005 Discovery Channel Young Scientist Challenge (DCYSC) (Src) || 
|-id=064
| 22064 Angelalewis ||  || Angela Lewis, American mentor of a finalist in the 2005 Discovery Channel Young Scientist Challenge (DCYSC) (Src) || 
|-id=065
| 22065 Colgrove ||  || Clinton Allen Colgrove, American mentor of a finalist in the 2005 Discovery Channel Young Scientist Challenge (DCYSC) (Src) || 
|-id=079
| 22079 Kabinoff ||  || Richard Kabinoff, American mentor of a finalist in the 2005 Discovery Channel Young Scientist Challenge (DCYSC) (Src) || 
|-id=080
| 22080 Emilevasseur ||  || Emile Levasseur, American mentor of a finalist in the 2005 Discovery Channel Young Scientist Challenge (DCYSC) (Src) || 
|-id=082
| 22082 Rountree ||  || Robert Rountree, American mentor of a finalist in the 2005 Discovery Channel Young Scientist Challenge (DCYSC)  (Src) || 
|}

22101–22200 

|-id=102
| 22102 Karenlamb ||  || Karen Lamb, mentor of a finalist in the 2005 Discovery Channel Young Scientist Challenge (DCYSC), a middle school science competition. †  || 
|-id=105
| 22105 Pirko ||  || Richard G. Pirko (1952–2008) was a producer and space science educator for the Ward Beecher Planetarium at Youngstown State University. An accomplished photographer, pilot and horse trainer, his passion for astronomy exposed many college students to new educational experiences || 
|-id=106
| 22106 Tomokoarai ||  || Tomoko Arai (born 1971), a scientist at the Chiba Institute of Technology. || 
|-id=109
| 22109 Loriehutch ||  || Lorie Hutchinson, mentor of a finalist in the 2005 Discovery Channel Young Scientist Challenge (DCYSC), a middle school science competition. †  || 
|-id=112
| 22112 Staceyraw ||  || Stacey Raw, mentor of a finalist in the 2005 Discovery Channel Young Scientist Challenge (DCYSC), a middle school science competition. †  || 
|-id=120
| 22120 Gaylefarrar ||  || Gayle Farrar, mentor of a finalist in the 2005 Discovery Channel Young Scientist Challenge (DCYSC), a middle school science competition.  †  || 
|-id=132
| 22132 Merkley ||  || Clark Merkley, mentor of a finalist in the 2005 Discovery Channel Young Scientist Challenge (DCYSC), a middle school science competition. †  || 
|-id=134
| 22134 Kirian ||  || Drew Kirian, mentor of a finalist in the 2005 Discovery Channel Young Scientist Challenge (DCYSC), a middle school science competition. †  || 
|-id=136
| 22136 Jamesharrison ||  || James Christopher Harrison (born 1936) is an Australian blood plasma donor whose unusual plasma composition has been used to make a treatment for Rhesus disease. His 1000 donations throughout his lifetime are estimated to have saved over two million unborn babies from the condition. || 
|-id=137
| 22137 Annettelee ||  || Annette Lee, mentor of a finalist in the 2005 Discovery Channel Young Scientist Challenge (DCYSC), a middle school science competition. †  || 
|-id=138
| 22138 Laynrichards ||  || Layne Richards, mentor of a finalist in the 2005 Discovery Channel Young Scientist Challenge (DCYSC), a middle school science competition.  †  || 
|-id=139
| 22139 Jamescox ||  || James Cox, mentor of a finalist in the 2005 Discovery Channel Young Scientist Challenge (DCYSC), a middle school science competition. †  || 
|-id=140
| 22140 Suzyamamoto ||  || Suzanne Yamamoto, mentor of a finalist in the 2005 Discovery Channel Young Scientist Challenge (DCYSC), a middle school science competition. †  || 
|-id=142
| 22142 Loripryor ||  || Lori Pryor, mentor of a finalist in the 2005 Discovery Channel Young Scientist Challenge (DCYSC), a middle school science competition. †  || 
|-id=143
| 22143 Cathyfowler ||  || Cathy Fowler, mentor of a finalist in the 2005 Discovery Channel Young Scientist Challenge (DCYSC), a middle school science competition. †  || 
|-id=144
| 22144 Linmichaels ||  || Linda Michaels, mentor of a finalist in the 2005 Discovery Channel Young Scientist Challenge (DCYSC), a middle school science competition. †  || 
|-id=146
| 22146 Samaan ||  || Fida Samaan, mentor of a finalist in the 2005 Discovery Channel Young Scientist Challenge (DCYSC), a middle school science competition. †  || 
|-id=148
| 22148 Francislee ||  || Francis Lee, mentor of a finalist in the 2005 Discovery Channel Young Scientist Challenge (DCYSC), a middle school science competition. †  || 
|-id=151
| 22151 Davebracy ||  || Dave Bracy, mentor of a finalist in the 2005 Discovery Channel Young Scientist Challenge (DCYSC), a middle school science competition. †  || 
|-id=152
| 22152 Robbennett ||  || Robbie Bennett,  mentor of a finalist in the 2005 Discovery Channel Young Scientist Challenge (DCYSC), a middle school science competition. †  || 
|-id=153
| 22153 Kathbarnhart ||  || Kathy Barnhart, mentor of a finalist in the 2005 Discovery Channel Young Scientist Challenge (DCYSC), a middle school science competition.  †  || 
|-id=155
| 22155 Marchetti ||  || David Marchetti, mentor of a finalist in the 2005 Discovery Channel Young Scientist Challenge (DCYSC), a middle school science competition. †  || 
|-id=156
| 22156 Richoffman ||  || Richard Hoffman, mentor of a finalist in the 2005 Discovery Channel Young Scientist Challenge (DCYSC), a middle school science competition.  †  || 
|-id=157
| 22157 Bryanhoran ||  || Bryan Horan, mentor of a finalist in the 2005 Discovery Channel Young Scientist Challenge (DCYSC), a middle school science competition. †  || 
|-id=158
| 22158 Chee ||  || Carmelita Chee, mentor of a finalist in the 2005 Discovery Channel Young Scientist Challenge (DCYSC), a middle school science competition. †  || 
|-id=161
| 22161 Santagata ||  || William Santagata, mentor of a finalist in the 2005 Discovery Channel Young Scientist Challenge (DCYSC), a middle school science competition.  †  || 
|-id=162
| 22162 Leslijohnson ||  || Leslie Johnson, mentor of a finalist in the 2005 Discovery Channel Young Scientist Challenge (DCYSC), a middle school science competition.  †  || 
|-id=165
| 22165 Kathydouglas ||  || Kathy Douglas, mentor of a finalist in the 2005 Discovery Channel Young Scientist Challenge (DCYSC), a middle school science competition.  †  || 
|-id=167
| 22167 Lane-Cline ||  || Amanda Lane-Cline, mentor of a finalist in the 2005 Discovery Channel Young Scientist Challenge (DCYSC), a middle school science competition.  †  || 
|-id=168
| 22168 Weissflog ||  || Jens Weißflog, the "Fichtelberg flea", German ski jumper || 
|-id=171
| 22171 Choi ||  || Diane Jeehea Choi, American finalist in the 2006 Intel Science Talent Search (ISTS), for her behavioral and social sciences project. || 
|-id=173
| 22173 Myersdavis ||  || Myers Abraham Davis, American finalist in the 2006 Intel Science Talent Search (ISTS), for his computer science project. || 
|-id=174
| 22174 Allisonmae ||  || Allison Mae Gardner, American finalist in the 2006 Intel Science Talent Search (ISTS), for her zoology project. || 
|-id=177
| 22177 Saotome ||  || Masatoshi Saotome, Japanese director of the Japan Space Forum and contributor to the construction of the Bisei Spaceguard Center || 
|-id=183
| 22183 Canonlau ||  || Canon Lau (born 1965), a veteran amateur astronomer in Hong Kong since the 1980s, has put tremendous efforts into planetary observations and imaging. || 
|-id=184
| 22184 Rudolfveltman ||  || Rudolf Veltman (1951–2009) was a founding member of the Dutch Meteor Society. Because of a diving accident, he was paralyzed and wheelchair bound. Undeterred, he became leader of the DMS's visual meteor section and wrote articles about meteor showers and visual meteor observations for the society's journal Radiant || 
|-id=185
| 22185 Štiavnica ||  || Banská Štiavnica, Slovakia, UNESCO World Heritage List site and birthplace of the second discoverer || 
|-id=189
| 22189 Gijskatgert || 2049 P-L || Gijs Katgert (1981–2011), Dutch physicist and son of Leiden astronomers Peter and Jet Katgert, was one of the pioneers of the research on the flow properties of foams. || 
|-id=190
| 22190 Stellakwee || 2100 P-L || Stella Vooren Kwee (1964–2005) was the daughter of Leiden astronomer K. K. Kwee and his wife, Sunny Kwee. || 
|-id=191
| 22191 Achúcarro || 2113 P-L || Joaquí Achúcarro, distinguished concert pianist, admired teacher and mentor, with a performance career spanning over 50 years in more than 50 countries. || 
|-id=192
| 22192 Vivienreuter || 2571 P-L || Vivien Reuter, IAU Executive Assistant from 2008 March until 2012 October, heading the IAU Secretariat in Paris. || 
|-id=195
| 22195 Nevadodelruiz || 3509 P-L || Nevado del Ruiz, 5389-m active volcano in Colombia, situated in Colombias Cordillera Central, a part of the Andes. || 
|-id=199
| 22199 Klonios || 4572 P-L || Klonios, one of the four Pelasgian Epeioi kings during the Trojan war || 
|}

22201–22300 

|-id=203
| 22203 Prothoenor || 6020 P-L || Prothoenor, a hero from Boeotia in the fight against Troy, as were Klonios and Arkesilaos. || 
|-id=222
| 22222 Hodios || 3156 T-2 || The Greek herald Hodios went together with the other Greek herald Eurybates, Odysseus and Phoenix to persuade Achilles to stop his quarrel with Agamemnon and fight the Trojans again. || 
|-id=227
| 22227 Polyxenos || 5030 T-2 || Polyxenos came from Elis and fought against the Trojans. || 
|-id=249
| 22249 Dvorets Pionerov ||  || Dvorets pionerov (Дворец пионеров, "Palace of Pioneers"), the Moscow City Palace of Youth Creativity, founded in 1936 || 
|-id=250
| 22250 Konstfrolov ||  || Konstantin Vasil'evich Frolov, Russian engineer, Academician of the Russian Academy of Sciences || 
|-id=253
| 22253 Sivers ||  || Yakov Efimovich Sivers (1731–1808) was an outstanding Russian statesman, governor of Novgorod province. As the founder and director of the Waterways Communications Department he made an invaluable contribution to navigation in Russia. In particular, he reconstructed the old canals between the Volga and Neva rivers || 
|-id=254
| 22254 Vladbarmin ||  || Vladimir Pavlovich Barmin, 20th-century Russian space engineer || 
|-id=260
| 22260 Ur || 1979 UR || Ur, Sumer † || 
|-id=263
| 22263 Pignedoli || 1980 RC || Antonio Pignedoli, a mathematics professor at the Military Academy of Modena || 
|-id=275
| 22275 Barentsen || 1982 BU || Geert Barentsen, Belgian astronomer. || 
|-id=276
| 22276 Belkin ||  || Anatoly Pavlovich Belkin, Russian painter. || 
|-id=277
| 22277 Hirado ||  || Hirado is a town in Nagasaki Prefecture, Japan. The Portuguese arrived in 1550, and during the early Edo period (beginning in 1603) Hirado became a center of trade with Portugal, the Netherlands and England. || 
|-id=278
| 22278 Protitch ||  || Milorad B. Protić, Serbian astronomer. || 
|-id=280
| 22280 Mandragora ||  || a genus belonging to the nightshade family (Solanaceae). Members of the genus are known as mandrakes. They are perennial herbaceous plants, with large tap-roots and leaves in the form of a rosette. Individual flowers are bell-shaped, whitish through to violet, and are followed by yellow or orange berries. || 
|-id=281
| 22281 Popescu || 1985 PC || Marcel Popescu (born 1983), a specialist in asteroid spectroscopy at the Astronomical Institute of the Romanian Academy in Bucharest. || 
|-id=283
| 22283 Pytheas || 1986 PY || Pytheas (fl. 4th century BC) was a geographer from the Greek colony of Massalia (Marseille) || 
|-id=291
| 22291 Heitifer ||  || Heinrich (born 1998), Tibère (born 1999) and Ferdinand (born 2000), the three grandsons of German discoverer Freimut Börngen || 
|-id=292
| 22292 Mosul ||  || Mosul is a city on the Tigris in northern Iraq, 400 km north of Baghdad. The area of Mosul was a part of Assyria from the 25th century BCE. Famous for its Grand Mosque, Mosul's craftsmen were admired for their metalwork, using gold and silver for inlay on bronze and brass. || 
|-id=294
| 22294 Simmons ||  || Michael ("Mike") S. Simmons, American amateur astronomer who assisted in organizing the photographic glass plate archive of the 1.2-m Schmidt Oschin Telescope at Palomar Observatory || 
|-id=299
| 22299 Georgesteiner || 1990 GS || George Steiner, French-American author, essayist, and literary critic. || 
|}

22301–22400 

|-id=312
| 22312 Kelly ||  || Thomas J. Kelly (1929–2002), an American aerospace engineer and chief engineer of the Apollo Lunar Module. Considered the "Father of the LM", he and his Grumman Aerospace engineering team oversaw the design, construction and testing of each of the spacecraft that safely landed twelve men on the Moon. || 
|-id=322
| 22322 Bodensee ||  || Lake Constance, is a border sea of the Alps, adjoining Germany, Switzerland and Austria. The river Rhine flows through it. It is an old cultivated and cultural landscape. The name was suggested by co-discoverer Freimut Börngen. || 
|-id=338
| 22338 Janemojo || 1992 LE || Morris Jones and his wife Jane, astronomers. || 
|-id=341
| 22341 Francispoulenc || 1992 PF || Francis Poulenc (1899–1963), French composer. He put to music poetry from the avant-garde poets Apollinaire, Eluard and Aragon. His most popular song is Les Chemins de l'amour (1940). Poulenc's religious devotion led to compositions such as Stabat Mater (1950) and Dialogues of the Carmelites (1953). || 
|-id=346
| 22346 Katsumatatakashi ||  || Takashi Katsumata (born 1952) is a professor of Nagasaki University and author of many articles on Japanese mythology related to stars. || 
|-id=347
| 22347 Mishinatakashi ||  || Takashi Mishina (born 1953) is a Japanese editor of natural science and an illustrator. || 
|-id=348
| 22348 Schmeidler ||  ||  (1920–2008), a German astronomer at the Munich Observatory  for many years and professor at Munich University. He is known for his contributions to classical astronomy and the history of astronomy. The name was suggested by co-discoverer Lutz Schmadel. || 
|-id=351
| 22351 Yamashitatoshiki ||  || Toshiki Yamashita (born 1934) is a Japanese high school physics teacher. He has undertaken 43 expeditions to view total and annular solar eclipses. || 
|-id=352
| 22352 Fujiwarakenjiro ||  || Kenjiro Fujiwara (1894–1910) was a childhood friend of Japanese novelist Kenji Miyazawa whose fantasy novel  Night on the Galactic Railroad depicts a protagonist based on Kenjiro. || 
|-id=354
| 22354 Sposetti ||  || Stefano Sposetti (born 1958), a Swiss amateur astronomer and teacher who lives in the country's Italian-speaking part in the Lepontine Alps. Since his youth he has been a very active observer of minor planets, comets, artificial satellites and meteors. He is also a helpful friend to budding young amateur astrometrists. || 
|-id=355
| 22355 Yahabananshozan ||  || Yahabananshozan is the name of a 848-meter mountain in Iwate Prefecture of Japan. It appears in Kenji Miyazawa's famous story "Taneyamagahara no Yoru" ("The Night of Taneyamagahara"). || 
|-id=356
| 22356 Feyerabend ||  || Paul Feyerabend (1924–1994) was a philosopher who criticized the scientific method, proposing instead that scientists use any method that works in their research || 
|-id=366
| 22366 Flettner || 1993 MT || Anton Flettner (1885–1961) was a German aviation engineer and inventor. He made important contributions to airplane and helicopter design. Name suggested by R. Jedicke and P. Jedicke. || 
|-id=369
| 22369 Klinger ||  || Max Klinger (1857–1920), German sculptor, painter and etcher † || 
|-id=370
| 22370 Italocalvino ||  || Italo Calvino (1923–1985), an Italian writer and novelist who produced fantastic tales such as The Cloven Viscount (1952), The Baron in the Trees (1957) and The Nonexistent Knight (1959). His Le cosmicomiche is a stream-of-consciousness narrative that treats the creation and evolution of the Universe. || 
|-id=378
| 22378 Gaherty ||  || | Geoff Gaherty (born 1941) is an amateur astronomer who writes about observing and won the Chant Medal of the Royal Astronomical Society of Canada in 2008. || 
|-id=379
| 22379 Montale ||  || Eugenio Montale (1896–1981) an Italian poet who received the 1975 Nobel Prize in Literature. He was also an editor, translator, and prose writer. || 
|-id=383
| 22383 Nikolauspacassi || 1994 EL || Nikolaus Franz Leonhard von Pacassi (1716–1790) was an Austrian architect of Italian origin. || 
|-id=385
| 22385 Fujimoriboshi ||  || The Tokyo Metropolitan Fujimori High school, where co-discoverer Masanori Hirasawa teaches astronomy and Earth science. It is one of the traditional high schools in the Tokyo Tama area. The naming took place on the occasion of the school's 70th anniversary. || 
|-id=394
| 22394 Kondouakira || 1994 TO || Akira Kondou (born 1943) has been director of the Saga City Hoshizora Astronomy Center since 2016. He is a widely respected astronomy scholar and a keen popularizer of astronomy in Japan. || 
|-id=395
| 22395 Ourakenji ||  || Kenji Oura (born 1965) is the director of the Kanoya City Planetarium, Kagoshima prefecture, Japan. He organizes local star parties for amateur astronomers and lay persons alike. || 
|}

22401–22500 

|-
| 22401 Egisto ||  || Egisto Masotti (born 1944), amateur astronomer in the Montelupo group of amateur astronomers. || 
|-id=402
| 22402 Goshi || 1995 GN || Goshi Nakamura (born 2001), whose initials are those of the provisional designation of this minor planet, is the son of the discoverer. || 
|-id=403
| 22403 Manjitludher || 1995 LK || Manjit Kaur Ludher, Deputy President of the Sikh Women's Awareness Network Society in Malaysia. || 
|-id=405
| 22405 Gavioliremo || 1995 OB || Remo Gavioli, Italian amateur astronomer, founding member of the G. Montanari Astronomical Society (Associazione Astronomica G. Montanari) in Cavezzo (Modena), Italy. || 
|-id=406
| 22406 Garyboyle ||  || Gary Boyle (born 1957) is a Canadian amateur astronomer who leads club activities, runs outreach events, teaches a college course and writes a stargazing column. || 
|-id=409
| 22409 Nagatohideaki ||  || Hideaki Nagato (born 1943) opened a nursery school and become its principal in Komatsu City, Ishikawa Prefecture, Japan. The school started with six children but now serves more than a thousand children. || 
|-id=410
| 22410 Grinspoon ||  || David Grinspoon (born 1959), an astrobiologist at the Southwest Research Institute, won the 2006 Carl Sagan Medal and wrote the award-winning book Lonely Planets. Name suggested by R. Jedicke and P. Jedicke. || 
|-id=413
| 22413 Haifu ||  || Hai Fu (born 1982) received his Ph.D. from the University of Hawaii and then worked at the University of Iowa, researching how galaxies evolve. Name suggested by R. and P. Jedicke. || 
|-id=414
| 22414 Hornschemeier ||  || At NASA-Goddard, Ann Hornschemeier (born 1975) specializes in studies of X-ray emission from star formation in galaxies at cosmologically-interesting distances. Name suggested by R. and P. Jedicke || 
|-id=415
| 22415 Humeivey ||  || James Nairn Patterson Hume (1923–2013) and Donald Glenn Ivey (born 1922) were physics educators, best known for their award-winning 1962 film Frames of Reference. Name suggested by R. and P. Jedicke. || 
|-id=416
| 22416 Tanimotoyoshi ||  || Motoyoshi Tani (born 1945) is a well-known astronomy popularizer in Osaka.  His interests include the design of astronomical telescopes, observational instruments, and astronomical observatories. || 
|-id=421
| 22421 Jamesedgar ||  || James Somerville Edgar (born 1946) spent 40 years as a Locomotive Engineer and rail Supervisor. He became President of the Royal Astronomical Society of Canada in 2014. Name suggested by R. and P. Jedicke || 
|-id=422
| 22422 Kenmount Hill ||  || Kenmount Hill (47°31' N, 52°47' W) is the location near St. John's, Newfoundland, where John Winthrop of Harvard College observed the transit of Venus in 1761. Name suggested by R. and P. Jedicke. || 
|-id=423
| 22423 Kudlacek ||  || Trina Kudlacek (born 1967) is a long-term volunteer with the University of Hawaii's Friends of the Institute for Astronomy, who helped arrange eclipse expeditions. Name suggested by R. and P. Jedicke. || 
|-id=426
| 22426 Mikehanes ||  || Michael Francis Hanes (born 1959) was a pilot for Air Canada, an amateur astronomer and telescope maker with the Royal Astronomical Society of Canada, London Centre. Name suggested by R. and P. Jedicke. || 
|-id=429
| 22429 Jurašek ||  || Pavel "Balvan" Jurašek (1955–2008) was a professional meteorologist and since 2006 director of the Slovak Hydrometeorological Institute in Košice). Interested in observing meteors, he was a member of the Slovak Union of Amateur Astronomers and the Slovak Astronomical Society || 
|-id=432
| 22432 Pamgriffin ||  || Pamela Defreyn Griffin (born 1966) obtained a B.Sc. in Geological Engineering in 1989 and is active in the University of Hawaii's "Friends of the IfA". || 
|-id=434
| 22434 Peredery ||  || Walter Volodymyr Peredery (born 1938) is a retired Canadian geologist who studied the Sudbury, Ontario, area and developed the view that it is an impact basin. Name suggested by P. and R. Jedicke. || 
|-id=435
| 22435 Pierfederici ||  || Francesco Pierfederici (born 1973) developed software for the Pan-STARRS moving object processing system and Large Synoptic Survey Telescope. Name suggested by P. and R. Jedicke. || 
|-id=440
| 22440 Bangsgaard || 1996 KA || Nicolai Bangsgaard (born 1976) is a Danish traveller and biker, who spent 1413 days cycling around the world, visiting 53 countries on six continents || 
|-id=442
| 22442 Blaha ||  || John Elmer Blaha, American astronaut † || 
|-id=446
| 22446 Philwhitney ||  || Phil Whitney (born 1927) has long supported astronomy in Hawaii and organized events for the University of Hawaii's "Friends of the Institute for Astronomy". Name suggested by P. and R. Jedicke. || 
|-id=448
| 22448 Ricksaunders ||  || John Richard Saunders (born 1946) makes astronomy accessories and began a term as President of the Royal Astronomical Society of Canada, London Centre, in 2012. Name suggested by P. and R. Jedicke. || 
|-id=449
| 22449 Ottijeff || 1996 VC || Ottilie Malfliet (born 1944) and Jeffrey Levine (born 1948) are the parents of the discoverer's wife. || 
|-id=450
| 22450 Nové Hrady || 1996 VN || Nové Hrady, south Bohemia, near the Czech-Austrian border †  || 
|-id=451
| 22451 Tymothycoons ||  || Tymothy Alan Coons (born 1955) is a pilot, flight engineer and inspector based in Tucson, Arizona, where he maintains various aircraft. One of his favorite jobs in Aereospace was at the Ballistic Missile Early Warning Site in Thule, Greenland: the purpose of this powerful radar was to look for objects in earth orbit || 
|-id=453
| 22453 Shibusawaeiichi ||  || Shibusawa Eiichi (1840–1931), called the "father of the modern Japanese economy", was involved in the founding of almost 500 companies and promoted economic development in Japan. He also poured his efforts into social welfare, social public enterprises and international relations around the turn of the 20th century. || 
|-id=454
| 22454 Rosalylopes ||  || A member of the Cassini Titan Radar Mapper Team at JPL, Rosaly M. C. Lopes-Gautier (born 1957) studies geology and volcanology. She discovered 71 volcanoes on Io. || 
|-id=456
| 22456 Salopek ||  || David Stephen Salopek (born 1963) earned a Ph.D. in cosmology from the University of Toronto in 1989 and worked at the Universities of Cambridge and Alberta. || 
|-id=465
| 22465 Karelanděl ||  || Karel Anděl, Czech astronomer and selenographer † || 
|-id=467
| 22467 Koharumi ||  || Kobayashi Harumi, Japanese master of the tea ceremony and an observing partner of the discoverer (this minor planet was detected on the same night as the comet P/1997 B1 (Kobayashi)) || 
|-id=469
| 22469 Poloniny ||  || Poloniny is the first dark sky protected area in Slovakia, proclaimed on 2010 December 3, located in the Poloniny National Park. || 
|-id=470
| 22470 Shirakawa-go ||  || Shirakawa=go is the village located on the border of Gifu Prefecture and Toyama Prefecture, Japan. It is famous for its big houses with thatched rafter roofs and was registered as a World Culture Heritage site in 1995 || 
|-id=473
| 22473 Stanleyhey ||  || James Stanley Hey (1909–2000), a British radar engineer. || 
|-id=474
| 22474 Frobenius ||  || Georg Ferdinand Frobenius (1849–1917), a professor at the University of Berlin. || 
|-id=475
| 22475 Stanrunge ||  || Stanley Edward John Runge (born 1956) is an experienced amateur astronomer and an active member of the Royal Astronomical Society of Canada, Winnipeg Centre. Name suggested by R. and P. Jedicke. || 
|-id=477
| 22477 Julimacoraor ||  || Juliana Mathea Coraor (born 1995) is a finalist in the 2012 Intel Science Talent Search, a science competition for high-school seniors, for her physics and space-science project. || 
|-id=480
| 22480 Maedatoshihisa ||  || Toshihisa Maeda (born 1963) is a Japanese amateur radio astronomer and president of the Kagoshima Astronomical Society ("Kagoshimaken Tenmon Kyoukai"), and an observer of variable stars. He is a high school teacher by profession. || 
|-id=481
| 22481 Zachlynn ||  || Zach Lynn mentored a finalist in the 2012 Intel Science Talent Search, a science competition for high-school seniors. || 
|-id=482
| 22482 Michbertier ||  || Michelle Bertier mentored a finalist in the 2012 Intel Science Talent Search, a science competition for high-school seniors.  || 
|-id=485
| 22485 Unterman ||  || Nathan Unterman mentored a finalist in the 2012 Intel Science Talent Search, a science competition for high-school seniors. || 
|-id=487
| 22487 Megphillips ||  || Megan Phillips mentored a finalist in the 2012 Intel Science Talent Search, a science competition for high-school seniors. || 
|-id=488
| 22488 Martyschwartz ||  || Martin Schwartz mentored a finalist in the 2012 Intel Science Talent Search, a science competition for high-school seniors. || 
|-id=489
| 22489 Yanaka ||  || Tetsuo Yanaka (born 1954) is a post office clerk and amateur astronomer in Japan. || 
|-id=490
| 22490 Zigamiyama ||  || Zigamiyama is a 1850-meter mountain located in the western part of the Iide mountain range, in the Bandai-Asahi National Park. It is a popular area for Japanese mountain climbers || 
|-id=492
| 22492 Mosig ||  || Thomas Mosig mentored a finalist in the 2012 Intel Science Talent Search, a science competition for high-school seniors. || 
|-id=494
| 22494 Trillium || 1997 JL || Since 1937, the White Trillium (Trillium grandiflorum) has been the official flower of Canada's province of Ontario, where it is often found in forests. || 
|-id=495
| 22495 Fubini ||  || Guido Fubini (1879–1943), lecturer at the universities of Catania, Genoa and Turin. || 
|-id=497
| 22497 Immanuelfuchs || 1997 KG || Immanuel Lazarus Fuchs (1833–1902) received a doctorate from the University of Berlin and taught at various secondary schools and universities. His work was mostly in the study of solutions and singularities of homogeneous linear differential equations in the complex domain.  || 
|-id=498
| 22498 Willman ||  || Mark Willman (born 1952) received his Ph.D. in planetary astronomy from the University of Hawaii's Institute for Astronomy and began working with Pan-STARRS1 in 2013.  || 
|-id=499
| 22499 Wunibaldkamm ||  || Wunibald Kamm (1893–1966) developed aerodynamic designs that reduce turbulence at high speeds for automobiles, including the widely seen Kammback or Kamm-tail. || 
|-id=500
| 22500 Grazianoventre || 1997 OJ || Graziano Ventre (born 1954) is an active member of the Osservatorio Astronomico Sormano and from his personal observatory, near his home in Bellagio (Italy), he obtains astrometric positions of comets and pictures of deep sky objects. He is a discoverer of minor planets. || 
|}

22501–22600 

|-id=503
| 22503 Thalpius ||  || Thalpius, son of Eurytus, leader of the Elean flotilla against Troy and one of those aboard the wooden horse † || 
|-id=505
| 22505 Lewit || 1997 UF || Since 1946, Karel Lewit (born 1916) has worked in leading Prague teaching hospitals, developing and propagating modern methods of rehabilitation and manual medicine, teaching and training specialists in that field at home and abroad. || 
|-id=512
| 22512 Cannat ||  || Guillaume Cannat, French scientific journalist and author of several books, including the annual Guide du ciel || 
|-id=517
| 22517 Alexzanardi ||  || Alex Zanardi (born 1966) is a former Formula 1 driver, 1997/1998 CART champion and 2005 Italian Superturismo Champion. After being seriously injured in a race in 2001, he turned to parathletics, winning two gold and one silver medals in handcycling at both the 2012 London and 2016 Rio Paralympics. || 
|-id=519
| 22519 Gerardklein ||  || Gérard Klein, French movie and television actor || 
|-id=521
| 22521 ZZ Top ||  || A power trio from Texas, ZZ Top was formed in 1969. Bearded Billy Gibbons (guitar and vocals) and Dusty Hill (bass and vocals), and beardless Frank Beard (percussion) produce energetic music that was used to close the dome of the OCA Schmidt telescope after a long night of observing || 
|-id=527
| 22527 Gawlik ||  || Evan Scott Gawlik, American finalist in the 2006 Intel Science Talent Search (ISTS) || 
|-id=528
| 22528 Elysehope ||  || Elyse Autumn Hope, American finalist in the 2006 Intel Science Talent Search (ISTS) || 
|-id=530
| 22530 Huynh-Le ||  || Minh-Phuong Huynh-Le, American finalist in the 2006 Intel Science Talent Search (ISTS) || 
|-id=531
| 22531 Davidkelley ||  || David Bruce Kelley, American finalist in the 2006 Intel Science Talent Search (ISTS) || 
|-id=533
| 22533 Krishnan ||  || Sheela Krishnan, American finalist in the 2006 Intel Science Talent Search (ISTS) || 
|-id=534
| 22534 Lieblich ||  || Jerrold Alexander Lieblich, American finalist in the 2006 Intel Science Talent Search (ISTS) || 
|-id=536
| 22536 Katelowry ||  || Kate Elizabeth Lowry, American finalist in the 2006 Intel Science Talent Search (ISTS) || 
|-id=537
| 22537 Meyerowitz ||  || Eric Allan Meyerowitz, American finalist in the 2006 Intel Science Talent Search (ISTS) || 
|-id=538
| 22538 Lucasmoller ||  || Lucas Edward Moller, American finalist in the 2006 Intel Science Talent Search (ISTS) || 
|-id=540
| 22540 Mork ||  || Anna Jolene Mork, American finalist in the 2006 Intel Science Talent Search (ISTS) || 
|-id=542
| 22542 Pendri ||  || Kiran Reddy Pendri, American finalist in the 2006 Intel Science Talent Search (ISTS) || 
|-id=543
| 22543 Ranjan ||  || Sukrit Ranjan, American finalist in the 2006 Intel Science Talent Search (ISTS) || 
|-id=544
| 22544 Sarahrapo ||  || Sarah Kate Rapoport, American finalist in the 2006 Intel Science Talent Search (ISTS) || 
|-id=545
| 22545 Brittrusso ||  || Brittany Nicole Russo, American finalist in the 2006 Intel Science Talent Search (ISTS) || 
|-id=546
| 22546 Schickler ||  || Carmiel Effron Schickler, American finalist in the 2006 Intel Science Talent Search (ISTS) || 
|-id=547
| 22547 Kimberscott ||  || Kimberly Megan Scott, American finalist in the 2006 Intel Science Talent Search (ISTS) || 
|-id=550
| 22550 Jonsellon ||  || Jonathan Blake Sellon, American finalist in the 2006 Intel Science Talent Search (ISTS) || 
|-id=551
| 22551 Adamsolomon ||  || Adam Ross Solomon, American finalist in the 2006 Intel Science Talent Search (ISTS) || 
|-id=553
| 22553 Yisun ||  || Yi Sun, American finalist in the 2006 Intel Science Talent Search (ISTS) || 
|-id=554
| 22554 Shoshanatell ||  || Shoshana Sophie Rothman Tell, American finalist in the 2006 Intel Science Talent Search (ISTS) || 
|-id=555
| 22555 Joevellone ||  || Joseph Daniel Vellone, American finalist in the 2006 Intel Science Talent Search (ISTS) || 
|-id=558
| 22558 Mladen ||  || Mladen Kolény Sr., father of the first discoverer, and Mladen Kolény Jr., his brother || 
|-id=561
| 22561 Miviscardi ||  || Michael Anthony Viscardi, American finalist in the 2006 Intel Science Talent Search (ISTS) || 
|-id=562
| 22562 Wage ||  || Nicholas Michael Wage, American finalist in the 2006 Intel Science Talent Search (ISTS) || 
|-id=563
| 22563 Xinwang ||  || Xin Wang, American finalist in the 2006 Intel Science Talent Search (ISTS) || 
|-id=564
| 22564 Jeffreyxing ||  || Jeffrey Chunlong Xing, American finalist in the 2006 Intel Science Talent Search (ISTS) || 
|-id=566
| 22566 Irazaitseva ||  || Irina Vladimirovna Zaitseva, American finalist in the 2006 Intel Science Talent Search (ISTS) || 
|-id=567
| 22567 Zenisek ||  || Sergio-Francis Mellejor Zenisek, American finalist in the 2006 Intel Science Talent Search (ISTS) || 
|-id=570
| 22570 Harleyzhang ||  || Harley Huiyu Zhang, American finalist in the 2006 Intel Science Talent Search (ISTS) || 
|-id=571
| 22571 Letianzhang ||  || Letian Zhang, American finalist in the 2006 Intel Science Talent Search (ISTS) || 
|-id=572
| 22572 Yuanzhang ||  || Yuan Zhang, American finalist in the 2006 Intel Science Talent Search (ISTS) || 
|-id=573
| 22573 Johnzhou ||  || John Cong Zhou, American finalist in the 2006 Intel Science Talent Search (ISTS) || 
|-id=575
| 22575 Jayallen ||  || Jay Allen, American mentor of a 2006 Intel Science Talent Search (ISTS) finalist || 
|-id=577
| 22577 Alfiuccio ||  || Alfio ("Alfiuccio") Grasso (1992–2004) died tragically at the age of twelve in a hunting accident on the slopes of Mt. Etna. The name was suggested by C. Blanco and M. Di Martino || 
|-id=579
| 22579 Marcyeager ||  || Marcy Eager, American mentor of a 2006 Intel Science Talent Search (ISTS) finalist || 
|-id=580
| 22580 Kenkaplan ||  || Kenneth Kaplan, American mentor of a 2006 Intel Science Talent Search (ISTS) finalist || 
|-id=581
| 22581 Rosahemphill ||  || Rosa Hemphill, American mentor of a 2006 Intel Science Talent Search (ISTS) finalist || 
|-id=582
| 22582 Patmiller ||  || Patricia Miller, American mentor of a 2006 Intel Science Talent Search (ISTS) finalist || 
|-id=583
| 22583 Metzler ||  || William Metzler, American mentor of a 2006 Intel Science Talent Search (ISTS) finalist || 
|-id=584
| 22584 Winigleason ||  || Winifred Gleason, American mentor of a 2006 Intel Science Talent Search (ISTS) finalist || 
|-id=586
| 22586 Shellyhynes ||  || Shelly Hynes, American mentor of a 2006 Intel Science Talent Search (ISTS) finalist || 
|-id=587
| 22587 McKennon ||  || Blanche McKennon, American mentor of a 2006 Intel Science Talent Search (ISTS) finalist || 
|-id=589
| 22589 Minor ||  || Tom Minor, American mentor of a 2006 Intel Science Talent Search (ISTS) finalist || 
|-id=594
| 22594 Stoops ||  || Tracy Stoops, American mentor of a 2006 Intel Science Talent Search (ISTS) finalist || 
|-id=596
| 22596 Kathwallace ||  || Kathleen Wallace, American mentor of a 2006 Intel Science Talent Search (ISTS) finalist || 
|-id=597
| 22597 Lynzielinski ||  || Lynne Zielinski, American mentor of a 2006 Intel Science Talent Search (ISTS) finalist || 
|-id=598
| 22598 Francespearl ||  || Frances Pearlmutter, American mentor of a 2006 Intel Science Talent Search (ISTS) finalist || 
|-id=599
| 22599 Heatherhall ||  || Heather Hall, American mentor of a 2006 Intel Science Talent Search (ISTS) finalist || 
|}

22601–22700 

|-id=603
| 22603 Davidoconnor ||  || David O'Connor, American mentor of a 2006 Intel Science Talent Search (ISTS) finalist || 
|-id=605
| 22605 Steverumsey ||  || Stephen Rumsey, American mentor of a 2006 Intel Science Talent Search (ISTS) finalist || 
|-id=611
| 22611 Galerkin || 1998 KB || Boris Grigorievich Galerkin (1871–1945) studied engineering in his native Russia and abroad. His scientific work centered on various problems in the theory of elasticity and structural mechanics, in particular the curvature of thin plates and the torsion and flexure of prismatic rods. || 
|-id=612
| 22612 Dandibner ||  || Daniel Dibner (born 1955) is director of philanthropy of the Cascade Foundation. A Sloan Fellow at the Massachusetts Institute of Technology, he has specialized in the history of science. He has also been an executive at several software and technology companies || 
|-id=613
| 22613 Callander ||  || Thomas Callander Price Zimmermann (born 1934) has been professor of renaissance history at Reed College (Oregon) and Davidson College (North Carolina). He is a past president of the American Alpine Club, where he helped organize Club policy on access to mountain recreation areas || 
|-id=616
| 22616 Bogolyubov ||  || Nikolai Nikolaevich Bogolyubov (1909–1992) was a Russian and Ukrainian Soviet mathematician and theoretical physicist known for his work in statistical field theory and dynamical systems. He was awarded the Dirac Medal in 1992. The name was suggested by K. I. Churyumov || 
|-id=617
| 22617 Vidphananu ||  || The name Vidphananu is a Ukrainian abbreviation for the Department of Physics and Astronomy of the National Academy of Sciences of Ukraine, which was created in Kiev in 1918. The name was suggested by K. I. Churyumov || 
|-id=618
| 22618 Silva Nortica ||  || Silva Nortica, "Northern Forest", ancient Latin name of the territory on the borders of South Bohemia and Lower Austria || 
|-id=619
| 22619 Ajscheetz ||  || Alfred J. Scheetz, American mentor of a 2006 Intel Science Talent Search (ISTS) finalist || 
|-id=621
| 22621 Larrybartel ||  || Larry Bartel, American mentor of a 2006 Intel Science Talent Search (ISTS) finalist || 
|-id=622
| 22622 Strong ||  || Joshua Strong, American mentor of a 2006 Intel Science Talent Search (ISTS) finalist || 
|-id=623
| 22623 Fisico ||  || Misael Fisico, American mentor of a 2006 Intel Science Talent Search (ISTS) finalist || 
|-id=625
| 22625 Kanipe ||  || Linda Kanipe, American mentor of a 2006 Intel Science Talent Search (ISTS) finalist || 
|-id=626
| 22626 Jengordinier ||  || Jennifer Gordinier, American mentor of a 2006 Intel Science Talent Search (ISTS) finalist || 
|-id=627
| 22627 Aviscardi ||  || Anthony Viscardi, American mentor of a 2006 Intel Science Talent Search (ISTS) finalist || 
|-id=628
| 22628 Michaelallen ||  || Michael Allen, American mentor of a 2006 Intel Science Talent Search (ISTS) finalist || 
|-id=630
| 22630 Wallmuth ||  || Joanne Wallmuth, American mentor of a 2006 Intel Science Talent Search (ISTS) finalist || 
|-id=631
| 22631 Dillard ||  || Linda Dillard, American mentor of a 2006 Intel Science Talent Search (ISTS) finalist || 
|-id=632
| 22632 DiNovis ||  || Joanne DiNovis, American mentor of a 2006 Intel Science Talent Search (ISTS) finalist || 
|-id=633
| 22633 Fazio ||  || Marc Fazio, American mentor of a 2006 Intel Science Talent Search (ISTS) finalist || 
|-id=638
| 22638 Abdulla ||  || Almas Ugurgizi Abdulla (born 1993) is a finalist in the 2006 Discovery Channel Young Scientist Challenge (DCYSC), a middle school science competition, for her mathematics project. She attends the Stone Middle School, Melbourne, Florida || 
|-id=639
| 22639 Nickanthony ||  || Nick Alan Anthony (born 1993) is a finalist in the 2006 Discovery Channel Young Scientist Challenge (DCYSC), a middle school science competition, for his biochemistry, medicine, health, and microbiology project. He attends the Three Oaks Middle School, Ft. Myers, Florida || 
|-id=640
| 22640 Shalilabaena ||  || Shalila Alejandra Baena (born 1994) is a finalist in the 2006 Discovery Channel Young Scientist Challenge (DCYSC), a middle school science competition, for her botany and zoology project. She attends the Haaheo Elementary School, Hilo, Hawaii || 
|-id=644
| 22644 Matejbel ||  || Matej Bel (1684–1749), Slovak historian and a great scholar of the eighteenth century || 
|-id=645
| 22645 Rotblat ||  || Joseph Rotblat (1908–2005) was a Nobel Peace Prize laureate in 1995 for his efforts toward nuclear disarmament. A signatory to the 1955 Russell-Einstein manifesto, he was the guiding spirit of the Pugwash Conferences on Science and World Affairs and helped prevent the use of nuclear weapons during the Cold War || 
|-id=647
| 22647 Lévi-Strauss ||  || French anthropologist and ethnologist Claude Lévi-Strauss (1908–2009) introduced structuralism as the basis of human perception. Disillusioned with the study of philosophy at the Sorbonne, he went in 1935 to Brazil, where his research on Indian tribes culminated in Tristes Tropiques (1955) and La Pensée Sauvage (1962) || 
|-id=656
| 22656 Aaronburrows ||  || Aaron Phillip Burrows (born 1992) is a finalist in the 2006 Discovery Channel Young Scientist Challenge (DCYSC), a middle school science competition, for his botany and zoology project. He attends the Bradley Middle School, San Antonio, Texas || 
|-id=666
| 22666 Josephchurch ||  || Joseph Christopher Church (born 1992) is a finalist in the 2006 Discovery Channel Young Scientist Challenge (DCYSC), a middle school science competition, for his engineering project. He attends the Alice Deal Junior High School, Washington, District of Columbia || 
|-id=675
| 22675 Davidcohn ||  || David Milton Cohn III (born 1992) is a finalist in the 2006 Discovery Channel Young Scientist Challenge (DCYSC), a middle school science competition, for his environmental sciences project. He attends the Rhoades School, Encinitas, California || 
|-id=679
| 22679 Amydavid ||  || Amy Jane David (born 1991) is a finalist in the 2006 Discovery Channel Young Scientist Challenge (DCYSC), a middle school science competition, for her environmental sciences project. She attends the Pinedale Middle School, Pinedale, Wyoming || 
|-id=685
| 22685 Dominguez ||  || Isabella Rosa Dominguez (born 1991) is a finalist in the 2006 Discovery Channel Young Scientist Challenge (DCYSC), a middle school science competition, for her botany and zoology project. She attends the Key Biscayne Elementary School, Miami, Florida || 
|-id=686
| 22686 Mishchenko ||  || Michael Ivanovich Mischenko (born 1959), of the NASA Goddard Institute for Space Studies, studies electromagnetic scattering. He has developed a new branch of statistical optics based on numerically exact solutions of Maxwell's equations || 
|-id=692
| 22692 Carfrekahl ||  || Caroline and Frederikke Kahl, granddaughters of Danish astronomer Leif Kahl Kristensen, a friend of the discoverer (the latter are both members of IAU Commission 20, Positions and Motions of Minor Planets, Comets and Satellites) || 
|-id=694
| 22694 Tyndall ||  || John Tyndall (1820–1893), an Irish natural philosopher and glaciologist who made fundamental investigations of the motion of glaciers, insisting that the flow is due to fracture and regelation. He is known for the Tyndall effect in suspensions. || 
|-id=697
| 22697 Mánek || 1998 RM || Jan Karel Mánek, Czech amateur astronomer. || 
|}

22701–22800 

|-
| 22701 Cyannaskye ||  || Cyanna Skye Edwards (born 1992) is a finalist in the 2006 Discovery Channel Young Scientist Challenge (DCYSC), a middle school science competition, for her biochemistry, medicine, health, and microbiology project. She attends the Buckner Fanning Christian School, San Antonio, Texas || 
|-id=705
| 22705 Erinedwards ||  || Erin Nicole Edwards (born 1995) is a finalist in the 2006 Discovery Channel Young Scientist Challenge (DCYSC), a middle school science competition, for her physical science project. She attends the John Hancock Charter School, Pleasant Grove, Utah || 
|-id=706
| 22706 Ganguly ||  || Shilpi Ganguly (born 1994) is a finalist in the 2006 Discovery Channel Young Scientist Challenge (DCYSC), a middle school science competition, for her biochemistry, medicine, health, and microbiology project. She attends the Trailwood Elementary School, Overland Park, Kansas || 
|-id=707
| 22707 Jackgrundy ||  || Jack Mark Grundy (born 1993) is a finalist in the 2006 Discovery Channel Young Scientist Challenge (DCYSC), a middle school science competition, for his biochemistry, medicine, health, and microbiology project. He attends the St. Francis of Assisi School, Louisville, Kentucky || 
|-id=717
| 22717 Romeuf ||  || David Romeuf (born 1969), a French amateur astronomer who worked as a student at the OCA Schmidt telescope  in order to automate it, and is now research engineer at UCBL in Lyon, France. He has continued to work in pro-am astronomy and was project manager for the HACO-CLIMSO coronagraph at the Pic du Midi Observatory. || 
|-id=719
| 22719 Nakadori ||  || Nakadori is the central part of Fukushima prefecture, Japan, and is located between the Ōu Mountains and Abukuma highland. || 
|-id=722
| 22722 Timothycooper ||  || Timothy P. Cooper (born 1958), the Director of the Comet and Meteor Section of the Astronomical Society of Southern Africa. || 
|-id=723
| 22723 Edlopez ||  || As a research engineer, Edward ("Ed") B. Lopez III (1939–2010), created the first industrial robot to automate parcel sorting. His team designed the DIAD (Delivery Information Acquisition Device), a handheld data collector used to record and transmit delivery information || 
|-id=724
| 22724 Byatt ||  || Antonia Susan ("A. S.") Byatt (born 1936) is an English writer, well known for her novels and short stories. She is a winner of the Booker Prize for Fiction and became a Dame Commander of the Order of the British Empire in 1999 || 
|-id=725
| 22725 Drabble ||  || English writer Margaret Drabble (born 1939) has, among other works, published seventeen novels, has edited The Oxford Companion to English literature and is a biographer of Arnold Bennett and Angus Wilson. She became a Dame Commander of the Order of the British Empire in 2008 || 
|-id=729
| 22729 Anthennig ||  || Anthony Ian Hennig (born 1993) is a finalist in the 2006 Discovery Channel Young Scientist Challenge (DCYSC), a middle school science competition, for his physical science project. He attends the Powhatan Junior High School, Powhatan, Virginia || 
|-id=730
| 22730 Jacobhurwitz ||  || Jacob Benjamin Hurwitz (born 1992) is a finalist in the 2006 Discovery Channel Young Scientist Challenge (DCYSC), a middle school science competition, for his behavioral science project. He attends the Robert Frost Middle School, Rockville, Maryland || 
|-id=732
| 22732 Jakpor ||  || Otana Agape Jakpor (born 1993) is a finalist in the 2006 Discovery Channel Young Scientist Challenge (DCYSC), a middle school science competition, for her biochemistry, medicine, health, and microbiology project. She attends the Woodcrest Christian School, Riverside, California || 
|-id=734
| 22734 Theojones ||  || Theo Percy Jones (born 1993) is a finalist in the 2006 Discovery Channel Young Scientist Challenge (DCYSC), a middle school science competition, for his behavioral science project. He attends the Jones Home School, Tucson, Arizona || 
|-id=736
| 22736 Kamitaki ||  || Nolan M.K. Kamitaki (born 1992) is a finalist in the 2006 Discovery Channel Young Scientist Challenge (DCYSC), a middle school science competition, for his environmental sciences project. He attends the Waiakea Intermediate School, Hilo, Hawaii || 
|-id=739
| 22739 Sikhote-Alin ||  || Sikhote-Alin, a mountain range in eastern Siberia, extending about 900 km to the Russian Pacific. || 
|-id=740
| 22740 Rayleigh ||  || John William Rayleigh (1842–1919), an English physicist and Nobelist || 
|-id=744
| 22744 Esterantonucci ||  || Ester Antonucci (born 1945) is a solar physicist who has spent most of her career studying the sun using spacecraft. She participated in the Solar Maximum and SOHO missions and, since 2005, has been director of the Osservatorio Astronomico di Torino---the first woman to hold this position || 
|-id=745
| 22745 Rikuzentakata ||  || Rikuzentakata, a city in Iwate, Japan. || 
|-id=752
| 22752 Sabrinamasiero ||  || Sabrina Masiero (born 1970) is an astronomer and director of the educational popular science structure of the International Center for Astronomical Research GalHassin (Isnello, Sicily). GalHassin has achieved great success in the popularization of astronomy. || 
|-id=754
| 22754 Olympus ||  || Mount Olympus is the highest point in Greece. The cloud-veiled summit, and the heavens above, were believed by the ancients to be the dwelling place of the gods. || 
|-id=756
| 22756 Manpreetkaur ||  || Manpreet Kaur (born 1992) is a finalist in the 2006 Discovery Channel Young Scientist Challenge (DCYSC), a middle school science competition, for her biochemistry, medicine, health, and microbiology project. She attends the Seabrook Intermediate School, Seabrook, Texas || 
|-id=757
| 22757 Klimcak ||  || Sophie Haruna Klimcak (born 1992) is a finalist in the 2006 Discovery Channel Young Scientist Challenge (DCYSC), a middle school science competition, for her botany and zoology project. She attends the Palos Verdes Intermediate School, Palos Verdes, California || 
|-id=758
| 22758 Lemp ||  || Nicholas Andrew Lemp (born 1993) is a finalist in the 2006 Discovery Channel Young Scientist Challenge (DCYSC), a middle school science competition, for his earth and space science project. He attends the Lemp Home School, Waterford, Michigan || 
|-id=769
| 22769 Aurelianora ||  || Aurelia (born 1989) and Nora Sposetti (1991–1991) Sposetti, daughters of Swiss amateur astronomer Stefano Sposetti, who discovered this minor planet. || 
|-id=775
| 22775 Jasonelloyd ||  || Jason Eric Lloyd (born 1992) is a finalist in the 2006 Discovery Channel Young Scientist Challenge (DCYSC), a middle school science competition, for his botany and zoology project. He attends the Bonaire Middle School, Bonaire, Georgia || 
|-id=776
| 22776 Matossian ||  || Mikael Hagop Matossian (born 1994) is a finalist in the 2006 Discovery Channel Young Scientist Challenge (DCYSC), a middle school science competition, for his environmental sciences project. He attends the A.G.B.U. Manoogian Demirdjan School, Canoga Par, California || 
|-id=777
| 22777 McAliley ||  || Collin Northcott McAliley (born 1993) is a finalist in the 2006 Discovery Channel Young Scientist Challenge (DCYSC), a middle school science competition, for his environmental sciences project. He attends the Cocoa Beach Junior/Senior High School, Cocoa Beach, Florida || 
|-id=780
| 22780 McAlpine ||  || Jayleen Jo McAlpine (born 1993) is a finalist in the 2006 Discovery Channel Young Scientist Challenge (DCYSC), a middle school science competition, for her biochemistry, medicine, health, and microbiology project. She attends the Sunburst Elementary School, Sunburst, Montana || 
|-id=782
| 22782 Kushalnaik ||  || Kushal Ulhas Naik (born 1992) is a finalist in the 2006 Discovery Channel Young Scientist Challenge (DCYSC), a middle school science competition, for his biochemistry, medicine, health, and microbiology project. He attends the H.B. DuPont Middle School, Hockessin, Delaware || 
|-id=783
| 22783 Teng ||  || Stacy H. Teng (born 1980), a recent Ph.D. recipient at the University of Maryland, studies the evolution of nuclear activity in luminous and ultraluminous infrared galaxies and has confirmed the link between mergers and quasars. The name was suggested by M. M. Knight || 
|-id=784
| 22784 Theresaoei ||  || Theresa A. Oei (born 1993) is a finalist in the 2006 Discovery Channel Young Scientist Challenge (DCYSC), a middle school science competition, for her environmental sciences project. She attends the Oei Home School, Hebron, Connecticut || 
|-id=786
| 22786 Willipete ||  || William Garrett Pete (born 1995) is a finalist in the 2006 Discovery Channel Young Scientist Challenge (DCYSC), a middle school science competition, for his physical science project. He attends the Christina Huddleston Elementary School, Lakeville, Minnesota || 
|-id=788
| 22788 von Steuben ||  || Friedrich Wilhelm von Steuben (1730–1794), a Prussian military officer who taught standards of military drill and discipline to the Continental Army during the American Revolutionary War. Steuben Day parades (September) in New York and other American cities celebrate German culture || 
|-id=791
| 22791 Twarog ||  || Bruce Twarog (born 1952), a professor at the University of Kansas. || 
|-id=794
| 22794 Lindsayleona ||  || Lindsey Leona Precht (born 1993) is a finalist in the 2006 Discovery Channel Young Scientist Challenge (DCYSC), a middle school science competition, for her botany and zoology project. She attends the Miami Lakes Middle School, Miami, Florida || 
|}

22801–22900 

|-id=802
| 22802 Sigiriya ||  || Sigiriya is a fifth-century rock fortress in central Sri Lanka. It is a UNESCO World Heritage Site renowned for its frescoes. The name was suggested by N. H. Samarasinha || 
|-id=809
| 22809 Kensiequade ||  || Mackensie Kathryn Quade (born 1991) is a finalist in the 2006 Discovery Channel Young Scientist Challenge (DCYSC), a middle school science competition, for her biochemistry, medicine, health, and microbiology project. She attends the St. John the Baptist School, New Brighton, Minnesota || 
|-id=810
| 22810 Rawat ||  || Radhika Rawat (born 1992) is a finalist in the 2006 Discovery Channel Young Scientist Challenge (DCYSC), a middle school science competition, for her physical science project. She attends the Summit Middle School, Boulder, Colorado || 
|-id=812
| 22812 Ricker ||  || Philip Daniel Ricker (born 1994) is a finalist in the 2006 Discovery Channel Young Scientist Challenge (DCYSC), a middle school science competition, for his biochemistry, medicine, health, and microbiology project. He attends the Ropesville Independent School District, Ropesville, Texas || 
|-id=815
| 22815 Sewell ||  || Michael T. Sewell (born 1993) is a finalist in the 2006 Discovery Channel Young Scientist Challenge (DCYSC), a middle school science competition, for his physical science project. He attends the Everest Academy, Clarkston, Michigan || 
|-id=817
| 22817 Shankar ||  || Aarthi Shankar (born 1992) is a finalist in the 2006 Discovery Channel Young Scientist Challenge (DCYSC), a middle school science competition, for her biochemistry, medicine, health, and microbiology project. She attends the Mountain Ridge Middle School, Colorado Springs, Colorado || 
|-id=819
| 22819 Davidtao ||  || David Tao (born 1992) is a finalist in the 2006 Discovery Channel Young Scientist Challenge (DCYSC), a middle school science competition, for his environmental sciences project. He attends the Takoma Park Middle School, Silver Spring, Maryland || 
|-id=824
| 22824 von Neumann ||  || John von Neumann (Neumann János), Hungarian-born American mathematician † || 
|-id=827
| 22827 Arvernia ||  || Arvernia is the Latin name of the Auvergne, a region in south-central France. Much of the Auvergne region is covered by the Massif Central, an extinct volcanic mountain range. Name suggested by J. Meeus || 
|-id=828
| 22828 Jaynethomp ||  || Jayne B. Thompson (born 1991) is a finalist in the 2006 Discovery Channel Young Scientist Challenge (DCYSC), a middle school science competition, for her environmental sciences project. She attends the Pinedale Middle School, Pinedale, Wyoming || 
|-id=829
| 22829 Paigerin ||  || Paige Erin Thompson (born 1993) is a finalist in the 2006 Discovery Channel Young Scientist Challenge (DCYSC), a middle school science competition, for her environmental sciences project. She attends the Lincoln Middle School, Bradenton, Florida || 
|-id=830
| 22830 Tinker ||  || Joel Jack Tinker (born 1994) is a finalist in the 2006 Discovery Channel Young Scientist Challenge (DCYSC), a middle school science competition, for his engineering project. He attends the Covenant Christian Academy, Huntsville, Alabama || 
|-id=831
| 22831 Trevanvoorth ||  || Trevor Will van Voorthuijsen (born 1991) is a finalist in the 2006 Discovery Channel Young Scientist Challenge (DCYSC), a middle school science competition, for his behavioral science project. He attends the van Voorthuijsen Home School, Lecanto, Florida || 
|-id=833
| 22833 Scottyu ||  || Scott Sang Yu (born 1991) is a finalist in the 2006 Discovery Channel Young Scientist Challenge (DCYSC), a middle school science competition, for his behavioral science project. He attends the Robert Frost Middle School, Rockville, Maryland || 
|-id=835
| 22835 Rickgardner ||  || Rick Gardner mentored a finalist in the 2006 Discovery Channel Young Scientist Challenge (DCYSC), a middle school science competition. He teaches at the Three Oaks Middle School, Ft. Myers, Florida || 
|-id=836
| 22836 Leeannragasa ||  || LeeAnn Ragasa mentored a finalist in the 2006 Discovery Channel Young Scientist Challenge (DCYSC), a middle school science competition. She teaches at the Haaheo Elementary School, Hilo, Hawaii || 
|-id=837
| 22837 Richardcruz ||  || Richard Cruz mentored a finalist in the 2006 Discovery Channel Young Scientist Challenge (DCYSC), a middle school science competition. He teaches at the Bradley Middle School, San Antonio, Texas || 
|-id=838
| 22838 Darcyhampton ||  || Darcy Hampton mentored a finalist in the 2006 Discovery Channel Young Scientist Challenge (DCYSC), a middle school science competition. She teaches at the Alice Deal Junior High School, Washington, District of Columbia || 
|-id=839
| 22839 Richlawrence ||  || Richard Lawrence mentored a finalist in the 2006 Discovery Channel Young Scientist Challenge (DCYSC), a middle school science competition. He teaches at the Key Biscayne Elementary School, Miami, Florida || 
|-id=840
| 22840 Villarreal ||  || Margo Villarreal mentored a finalist in the 2006 Discovery Channel Young Scientist Challenge (DCYSC), a middle school science competition. She teaches at the Buckner Fanning Christian School, San Antonio, Texas || 
|-id=842
| 22842 Alenashort ||  || Alena Short mentored a finalist in the 2006 Discovery Channel Young Scientist Challenge (DCYSC), a middle school science competition. She teaches at the John Hancock Charter School, Pleasant Grove, Utah || 
|-id=843
| 22843 Stverak ||  || Janet Stverak mentored a finalist in the 2006 Discovery Channel Young Scientist Challenge (DCYSC), a middle school science competition. She teaches at the Trailwood Elementary School, Overland Park, Kansas || 
|-id=846
| 22846 Fredwhitaker ||  || Fred Joseph Whitaker mentored a finalist in the 2006 Discovery Channel Young Scientist Challenge (DCYSC), a middle school science competition. He teaches at the St. Francis of Assisi School, Louisville, Kentucky || 
|-id=847
| 22847 Utley ||  || Meredith Utley mentored a finalist in the 2006 Discovery Channel Young Scientist Challenge (DCYSC), a middle school science competition. She teaches at the Powhatan Junior High School, Powhatan, Virginia || 
|-id=848
| 22848 Chrisharriot ||  || Christian Harriot mentored a finalist in the 2006 Discovery Channel Young Scientist Challenge (DCYSC), a middle school science competition. He teaches at the Robert Frost Middle School, Rockville, Maryland || 
|-id=852
| 22852 Kinney ||  || Steve Kinney mentored a finalist in the 2006 Discovery Channel Young Scientist Challenge (DCYSC), a middle school science competition. He teaches at the Woodcrest Christian School, Riverside, California || 
|-id=855
| 22855 Donnajones ||  || Donna Jones mentored a finalist in the 2006 Discovery Channel Young Scientist Challenge (DCYSC), a middle school science competition. She teaches at the Jones Home School, Tucson, Arizona || 
|-id=856
| 22856 Stevenzeiher ||  || Steven Zeiher mentored a finalist in the 2006 Discovery Channel Young Scientist Challenge (DCYSC), a middle school science competition. He teaches at the Waiakea Intermediate School, Hilo, Hawaii || 
|-id=857
| 22857 Hyde ||  || Tammi Hyde mentored a finalist in the 2006 Discovery Channel Young Scientist Challenge (DCYSC), a middle school science competition. She teaches at the Seabrook Intermediate School, Seabrook, Texas || 
|-id=858
| 22858 Suesong ||  || Sue Song mentored a finalist in the 2006 Discovery Channel Young Scientist Challenge (DCYSC), a middle school science competition. She teaches at the Palos Verdes Intermediate School, Palos Verdes, California || 
|-id=860
| 22860 Francylemp ||  || Francy M. Lemp mentored a finalist in the 2006 Discovery Channel Young Scientist Challenge (DCYSC), a middle school science competition. She teaches at the Lemp Home School, Waterford, Michigan || 
|-id=862
| 22862 Janinedavis ||  || Janine Davis mentored a finalist in the 2006 Discovery Channel Young Scientist Challenge (DCYSC), a middle school science competition. She teaches at the Bonaire Middle School, Bonaire, Georgia || 
|-id=863
| 22863 Namarkarian ||  || Nanor Markarian mentored a finalist in the 2006 Discovery Channel Young Scientist Challenge (DCYSC), a middle school science competition. She teaches at the A.G.B.U. Manoogian Demirdjan School, Canoga Par, California || 
|-id=865
| 22865 Amymoffett ||  || Amy Moffett mentored a finalist in the 2006 Discovery Channel Young Scientist Challenge (DCYSC), a middle school science competition. She teaches at the Cocoa Beach Junior/Senior High School, Cocoa Beach, Florida || 
|-id=868
| 22868 Karst ||  || Carol A. Karst mentored a finalist in the 2006 Discovery Channel Young Scientist Challenge (DCYSC), a middle school science competition. She teaches at the Sunburst Elementary School, Sunburst, Montana || 
|-id=869
| 22869 Brianmcfar ||  || Brian McFarland mentored a finalist in the 2006 Discovery Channel Young Scientist Challenge (DCYSC), a middle school science competition. He teaches at the H.B. DuPont Middle School, Hockessin, Delaware || 
|-id=870
| 22870 Rosing ||  || Wayne Rosing (born 1946) is an electrical engineer and computer industry executive.  || 
|-id=871
| 22871 Ellenoei ||  || Ellen C. Oei mentored a finalist in the 2006 Discovery Channel Young Scientist Challenge (DCYSC), a middle school science competition. She teaches at the Oei Home School, Hebron, Connecticut || 
|-id=872
| 22872 Williamweber ||  || William James Weber mentored a finalist in the 2006 Discovery Channel Young Scientist Challenge (DCYSC), a middle school science competition. He teaches at the Christina Huddleston Elementary School, Lakeville, Minnesota || 
|-id=873
| 22873 Heatherholt ||  || Heather Holt mentored a finalist in the 2006 Discovery Channel Young Scientist Challenge (DCYSC), a middle school science competition. She teaches at the Miami Lakes Middle School, Miami, Florida || 
|-id=874
| 22874 Haydeephelps ||  || Haydee Phelps mentored a finalist in the 2006 Discovery Channel Young Scientist Challenge (DCYSC), a middle school science competition. She teaches at the Summit Middle School, Boulder, Colorado || 
|-id=875
| 22875 Lanejackson ||  || Lane L. Jackson mentored a finalist in the 2006 Discovery Channel Young Scientist Challenge (DCYSC), a middle school science competition. She teaches at the Ropesville Independent School District, Ropesville, Texas || 
|-id=877
| 22877 Reginamiller ||  || Regina Miller mentored a finalist in the 2006 Discovery Channel Young Scientist Challenge (DCYSC), a middle school science competition. She teaches at the Mountain Ridge Middle School, Colorado Springs, Colorado || 
|-id=880
| 22880 Pulaski ||  || A Polish soldier, Kazimierz Michal Waclaw Wiktor Pulaski (1745–1779), is often called "the father of American cavalry" in reference to training he provided to the Continental Army during the American Revolution. In Illinois, an eponymous holiday is traditionally held on the first Monday in March to celebrate Polish culture || 
|-id=885
| 22885 Sakaemura ||  || Sakaemura is a small mountainside village in Nagano prefecture, Japan. || 
|-id=889
| 22889 Donnablaney ||  || Donna Blaney mentored a finalist in the 2006 Discovery Channel Young Scientist Challenge (DCYSC), a middle school science competition. She teaches at the Takoma Park Middle School, Silver Spring, Maryland || 
|-id=890
| 22890 Ruthaellis ||  || Rutha Ellis mentored a finalist in the 2006 Discovery Channel Young Scientist Challenge (DCYSC), a middle school science competition. She teaches at the Lincoln Middle School, Bradenton, Florida || 
|-id=898
| 22898 Falce ||  || Falce, Italian for "Scythe", nickname of Renato Conedera, the discoverer's father-in-law. || 
|-id=899
| 22899 Alconrad ||  || Albert R. Conrad (born 1953) has been a dedicated adaptive-optics (AO) scientist at several U.S. observatories. Using AO, he has co-discovered many satellites of asteroids and made disk-resolved studies of asteroids and planetary satellites for size/shape/pole and topography. He has developed many innovative AO techniques. || 
|-id=900
| 22900 Trudie ||  || Trudie R. Wilson (1913–2001), mother of the discoverer. || 
|}

22901–23000 

|-
| 22901 Ivanbella ||  || Ivan Bella (born 1964 ), a Slovak cosmonaut || 
|-id=903
| 22903 Georgeclooney ||  || George Clooney (born 1961), an American actor || 
|-id=905
| 22905 Liciniotoso ||  || Licinio Toso (1920–1999), grandfather of Italian astronomer Alberto Toso, member of the discovering team at Farra d'Isonzo Observatory || 
|-id=906
| 22906 Lisauckis ||  || Rhonda Lisauckis mentored a finalist in the 2006 Discovery Channel Young Scientist Challenge (DCYSC), a middle school science competition. She teaches at the Covenant Christian Academy, Huntsville, Alabama || 
|-id=907
| 22907 van Voorthuijsen ||  || Lorrie van Voorthuijsen mentored a finalist in the 2006 Discovery Channel Young Scientist Challenge (DCYSC), a middle school science competition. She teaches at the van Voorthuijsen Home School, Lecanto, Florida || 
|-id=908
| 22908 Bayefsky-Anand ||  || Sarah Dana Bayefsky-Anand, American finalist in the 2007 Intel Science Talent Search (ISTS) || 
|-id=909
| 22909 Gongmyunglee ||  || Gongmyung Lee, American finalist in the 2007 Intel Science Talent Search (ISTS) || 
|-id=910
| 22910 Ruiwang ||  || Rui Wang, American finalist in the 2007 Intel Science Talent Search (ISTS) || 
|-id=911
| 22911 Johnpardon ||  || John Vincent Pardon, American finalist in the 2007 Intel Science Talent Search (ISTS) || 
|-id=912
| 22912 Noraxu ||  || Nora Xu, American finalist in the 2007 Intel Science Talent Search (ISTS) || 
|-id=913
| 22913 Brockman ||  || Gregory Drew Brockman, American finalist in the 2007 Intel Science Talent Search (ISTS) || 
|-id=914
| 22914 Tsunanmachi ||  || Tsunanmachi, a town in Niigata prefecture, Japan. || 
|-id=919
| 22919 Shuwan ||  || Shu Wan, American finalist in the 2007 Intel Science Talent Search (ISTS) || 
|-id=920
| 22920 Kaitduncan ||  || Kaitlin Duncan, American finalist in the 2007 Intel Science Talent Search (ISTS) || 
|-id=921
| 22921 Siyuanliu ||  || Siyuan Liu, American finalist in the 2007 Intel Science Talent Search (ISTS) || 
|-id=922
| 22922 Sophiecai ||  || Sophie Cai, American finalist in the 2007 Intel Science Talent Search (ISTS) || 
|-id=923
| 22923 Kathrynblair ||  || Kathryn Blair Friedman, American finalist in the 2007 Intel Science Talent Search (ISTS) || 
|-id=924
| 22924 Deshpande ||  || Neha Anil Deshpande, American finalist in the 2007 Intel Science Talent Search (ISTS) || 
|-id=927
| 22927 Blewett ||  || Megan Marie Blewett, American finalist in the 2007 Intel Science Talent Search (ISTS) || 
|-id=928
| 22928 Templehe ||  || Temple Mu He, American finalist in the 2007 Intel Science Talent Search (ISTS) || 
|-id=929
| 22929 Seanwahl ||  || Sean Matthew Wahl, American finalist in the 2007 Intel Science Talent Search (ISTS) || 
|-id=932
| 22932 Orenbrecher ||  || Oren Brecher, American finalist in the 2007 Intel Science Talent Search (ISTS) || 
|-id=933
| 22933 Mareverett ||  || Marshall Bradley Everett, American finalist in the 2007 Intel Science Talent Search (ISTS) || 
|-id=936
| 22936 Ricmccutchen ||  || Richard Matthew McCutchen, American finalist in the 2007 Intel Science Talent Search (ISTS) || 
|-id=937
| 22937 Nataliavella ||  || Natalie Avella Cameron, American finalist in the 2007 Intel Science Talent Search (ISTS) || 
|-id=938
| 22938 Brilawrence ||  || Brian Robert Lawrence, American finalist in the 2007 Intel Science Talent Search (ISTS) || 
|-id=939
| 22939 Handlin ||  || Daniel Adam Handlin, American finalist in the 2007 Intel Science Talent Search (ISTS) || 
|-id=940
| 22940 Chyan ||  || Yieu Chyan, American finalist in the 2007 Intel Science Talent Search (ISTS) || 
|-id=942
| 22942 Alexacourtis ||  || Alexandra Maria Courtis, American finalist in the 2007 Intel Science Talent Search (ISTS) || 
|-id=944
| 22944 Sarahmarzen ||  || Sarah Elizabeth Marzen, American finalist in the 2007 Intel Science Talent Search (ISTS) || 
|-id=945
| 22945 Schikowski ||  || Erin Marie Schikowski, American finalist in the 2007 Intel Science Talent Search (ISTS) || 
|-id=947
| 22947 Carolsuh ||  || Carol Yoon Joo Suh, American finalist in the 2007 Intel Science Talent Search (ISTS) || 
|-id=948
| 22948 Maidanak ||  || Maidanak, a mountainous region in southeast Uzbekistan. || 
|-id=951
| 22951 Okabekazuko ||  || Kazuko Okabe (born 1972), of the Japan Aerospace Exploration Agency, is the secretary of Junichiro Kawaguchi, project manager for the Hayabusa mission. || 
|-id=952
| 22952 Hommasachi ||  || Sachiko Homma (born 1965), of the Japan Aerospace Exploration Agency, is the secretary of Makoto Yoshikawa, project scientist for the Hayabusa mission || 
|-id=957
| 22957 Vaintrob ||  || Dmitry Vaintrob, American finalist in the 2007 Intel Science Talent Search (ISTS) || 
|-id=958
| 22958 Rohatgi ||  || Abhinav Rohatgi, American finalist in the 2007 Intel Science Talent Search (ISTS) || 
|-id=978
| 22978 Nyrola ||  || Nyrölä is a small rural village in central Finland and the site of the countryside observatory of the astronomical association Jyväskylän Sirius ry at Nyrölä Observatory || 
|-id=981
| 22981 Katz ||  || Daniel Scott Katz, American finalist in the 2007 Intel Science Talent Search (ISTS) || 
|-id=982
| 22982 Emmacall ||  || Emma Call, American finalist in the 2007 Intel Science Talent Search (ISTS) || 
|-id=983
| 22983 Schlingheyde ||  || Catherine Schlingheyde, American finalist in the 2007 Intel Science Talent Search (ISTS) || 
|-id=987
| 22987 Rebeckaufman ||  || Rebecca Lynn Kaufman, American finalist in the 2007 Intel Science Talent Search (ISTS) || 
|-id=988
| 22988 Jimmyhom ||  || Jimmy Hom, American finalist in the 2007 Intel Science Talent Search (ISTS) || 
|-id=989
| 22989 Loriskopp ||  || Lori Skopp, American mentor of a 2007 Intel Science Talent Search (ISTS) finalist || 
|-id=990
| 22990 Mattbrenner ||  || Matthew Brenner, American mentor of a 2007 Intel Science Talent Search (ISTS) finalist || 
|-id=991
| 22991 Jeffreyklus ||  || Jeffrey Klus, American mentor of a 2007 Intel Science Talent Search (ISTS) finalist || 
|-id=992
| 22992 Susansmith ||  || Susan Smith, American mentor of a 2007 Intel Science Talent Search (ISTS) finalist || 
|-id=993
| 22993 Aferrari ||  || Andrew Ferrari, American mentor of a 2007 Intel Science Talent Search (ISTS) finalist || 
|-id=994
| 22994 Workman ||  || David Workman, American mentor of a 2007 Intel Science Talent Search (ISTS) finalist || 
|-id=995
| 22995 Allenjanes ||  || Allen Janes, American mentor of a 2007 Intel Science Talent Search (ISTS) finalist || 
|-id=996
| 22996 De Boo ||  || Edward de Boo, American mentor of a 2007 Intel Science Talent Search (ISTS) finalist || 
|-id=998
| 22998 Waltimyer ||  || David Waltimyer, American mentor of a 2007 Intel Science Talent Search (ISTS) finalist || 
|-id=999
| 22999 Irizarry ||  || Carmen Irizarry, American mentor of a 2007 Intel Science Talent Search (ISTS) finalist || 
|}

References 

022001-023000